Douglas Esteban Sequeira Solano (Also known as El Esqueleto Sequeira) (born 23 August 1977 in San José, Costa Rica) is a Costa Rican former professional footballer who played as a defender.

Club career

Early career
Sequeira started his career in Costa Rica by playing for Saprissa in 1995. He moved abroad after the 1997 FIFA World Youth Championship to spend time in Europe with Feyenoord, who loaned him to then feeder club Excelsior for whom he made his debut in the Eerste Divisie against Emmen on 18 October 1997. In 1999, he signed for two years for German second division side Karlsruhe alongside compatriot Mínor Díaz, playing 24 matches, before returning to Costa Rica and Saprissa.

Major League Soccer
He was originally acquired by Major League Soccer and Real Salt Lake from Saprissa in exchange for Pablo Brenes, and was immediately sent to Chivas USA for a draft pick, and spent a year with the team. Subsequently, Sequeira ended up at Real Salt Lake but was waived following the 2006 season.

Tromsø
In December 2006, he signed a three-year contract with Norwegian club Tromsø. Sequeira got a good start to his career at Tromsø, scoring the 1–0 winning goal in the 8th minute of his first official match for the club, against Vålerenga on 9 April 2007. On 30 July 2009, Sequeira played his last match for Tromsø at Alfheim Stadion. He will return to Costa Rica and Saprissa, after playing against Vålerenga on 9 August 2009.

After playing a few more seasons for Saprissa, Sequeira retired in November 2013 and became manager of Saprissa's youth team.

International career
Sequeira has played for the Costa Rica national football team on various youth levels, and received his first senior cap in a February 1999 friendly match against Jamaica. Since then he has represented the national team 42 times scoring twice. He played in the 1997 FIFA World Youth Championship, held in Malaysia, and the 2006 FIFA World Cup.

FIFA suspended Sequeira for three matches following an incident where he kneed an opponent in the stomach during a 3–0 loss to the United States during qualifying for the 2006 FIFA World Cup.

His final international was an August 2010 friendly match against Paraguay.

International goals
Scores and results list Costa Rica's goal tally first.

Personal life
Sequeira is married to Andrea Borbón and they have a son, Douglas, and a daughter, Brianna. His older brother, Alejandro Sequeira played as forward.

References

External links
 

1977 births
Living people
Footballers from San José, Costa Rica
Association football defenders
Association football utility players
Costa Rican footballers
Costa Rica international footballers
2004 Copa América players
2005 UNCAF Nations Cup players
2005 CONCACAF Gold Cup players
2006 FIFA World Cup players
Copa Centroamericana-winning players
Deportivo Saprissa players
Feyenoord players
Excelsior Rotterdam players
Karlsruher SC players
Chivas USA players
Real Salt Lake players
Tromsø IL players
Costa Rican expatriate footballers
Expatriate footballers in the Netherlands
Expatriate footballers in Germany
Expatriate soccer players in the United States
Expatriate footballers in Norway
Costa Rican expatriate sportspeople in the Netherlands
Costa Rican expatriate sportspeople in Germany
Liga FPD players
Eerste Divisie players
2. Bundesliga players
Major League Soccer players
Eliteserien players
Central American Games gold medalists for Costa Rica
Central American Games medalists in football